Besovets is a rural locality (a village) in Prionezhsky District of the Republic of Karelia, Russia. Municipally, it is a part of the Shuyskoye Rural Settlement of Prionezhsky Municipal District.

It is located in the vicinity of the capital of Karelia, Petrozavodsk, on the Shuya River. The Petrozavodsk–Suoyarvi highway passes through the village.

Petrozavodsk airport is located in close proximity to the village.

History 
The village was founded in the 16th century.

On June 20, 2011, RusAir Flight 9605 crashed near Besovets while on approach to Petrozavodsk Airport, killing forty-five and injuring seven people.

Population 
In 2009 the village had a population of 120 people.

Gallery

References

Rural localities in the Republic of Karelia
Prionezhsky District